The IBM 805 Test Scoring Machine was a educational machine sold by IBM beginning in 1937.  The device scored answer sheets marked with special "mark sense" pencils.  The machine was developed from a prototype developed by Reynold Johnson, a school teacher who later became an IBM engineer. That machine and its descendants have been in use ever since.

See also 
Benjamin D. Wood

References

"Bulletin of Information on the International Test Scoring Machine." (New York: Cooperative Test Service, 1936)
IBM Archives web page on the 805 Test Scoring Machine

805
IBM educational computers